Váci KSE  is a Hungarian handball club from Vác, that plays in the  Nemzeti Bajnokság I, the top level championship in Hungary.

Crest, colours, supporters

Naming history

Kit manufacturers and Shirt sponsor
The following table shows in detail Váci KSE kit manufacturers and shirt sponsors by year:

Kits

Team 2012/13

Current squad
Squad for the 2012–13 season

Goalkeepers
 1  Norbert Vitáris
 12  Levente Nagy
 16  Ádám Valkusz
Wingers
 2  Péter Szikra
 9  Ferenc Császár
 20  Máté Gábori
 23  Máté Munkácsi
Line players
 10  Mihály Tyiskov
 15  István Rosta
 19  Tibor Szabó

Back players
 3  Ádám Bajorhegyi
 5  Kristóf Székely
 6  Péter Simányi
 7  Balázs Dóra
 8  Ádám Korsós
 11  Tibor Kökény
 13  Levente Sipeki
 14  Gábor Karap
 17  János Csík
 18  Renátó Nikolicza
 21  Pál Gergely

Staff members
  Head Coach: Roland Kata
  Club Doctor: Zoltán Jakab, MD
  Masseur: Ferenc Pálinkás

Previous Squads

Honours

Recent seasons

Seasons in Nemzeti Bajnokság I: 5
Seasons in Nemzeti Bajnokság I/B: 8
Seasons in Nemzeti Bajnokság II: 13

EHF Ranking

Former club members

Notable former players

 Ádám Bajorhegyi
 Donát Bartók
 Dávid Fekete
  Szergej Kuzmicsov
 Péter Lendvay
 István Rosta
  Mihály Tóth
  Marko Vasić
 Norbert Vitáris
 Marko Davidovic
 Aleh Astrashapkin
 Dzmitry Chystabayeu
 Ante Grbavac
 Marin Sakić
 Petar Topic (2016-2017)
 Milan Popović 
 József Holpert
 Darko Pavlović
 Aleksandar Stanojević
 Nemanja Vucicevic
 Teodor Paul
 Idriss Drissi
 Roman Chychykalo

References

External links
 Official website
 

Hungarian handball clubs
Sport in Pest County
Vác